Moscow is a city in Fayette County, Tennessee, United States. The population was 556 at the 2010 census, up from 422 at the 2000 census. The town was named after a Cherokee Chief [Mosgo], meaning "Town between 2 rivers." North Fork and Wolf Rivers.
Army Corps of Engineers rerouted the waterways.

Geography
Moscow is located in southern Fayette County at  (35.060976, -89.399649), at the confluence of the Wolf River with its North Fork.

Tennessee State Route 57 passes through the city, leading east  to Grand Junction and west  to Collierville. Tennessee State Route 76 leads north from Moscow  to Somerville, the Fayette County seat.

Climate

According to the Köppen Climate Classification system, Moscow has a humid subtropical climate, abbreviated "Cfa" on climate maps.

Demographics

As of the census of 2000, there were 422 people, 172 households, and 108 families residing in the city. The racial makeup of the city was 68.96% White, 29.15% African American, 0.24% Native American, 0.47% from other races, and 1.18% from two or more races. Hispanic or Latino of any race were 1.18% of the population.

There were 172 households, out of which 18.6% had children under the age of 18 living with them, 41.9% were married couples living together, 18.6% had a female householder with no husband present, and 37.2% were non-families. 36.0% of all households were made up of individuals, and 23.8% had someone living alone who was 65 years of age or older. The average household size was 2.45 and the average family size was 3.24.

In the city, the population was spread out, with 20.9% under the age of 18, 10.9% from 18 to 24, 25.6% from 25 to 44, 22.3% from 45 to 64, and 20.4% who were 65 years of age or older. The median age was 39 years. For every 100 females, there were 76.6 males. For every 100 females age 18 and over, there were 70.4 males.

The median income for a household in the city was $33,021, and the median income for a family was $46,875. Males had a median income of $35,417 versus $21,346 for females. The per capita income for the city was $14,772. About 16.3% of families and 21.0% of the population were below the poverty line, including 21.1% of those under age 18 and 24.2% of those age 65 or over.

Battle of Moscow
Moscow was the site of a skirmish during the Civil War on December 4, 1863. Confederate cavalry under the command of Gen. Stephen D. Lee attempted to burn the railroad bridge over the Wolf River, in order to aid Gen. Nathan Bedford Forrest in returning to Tennessee from Mississippi. They were thwarted by African-American Union troops who were stationed nearby. Union Gen. Stephen A. Hurlbut wrote of these troops in a dispatch dated December 17, 1863: "The recent affair at Moscow, Tennessee, has demonstrated the fact that colored troops, properly trained and disciplined, can and will fight well."

Famous residents
Compton Newby Crook, who was born in Rossville, Tennessee, and who wrote science fiction under the pseudonym Stephen Tall, grew up in Moscow.

Gallery

References

External links
City of Moscow official website
Fayette County Chamber of Commerce

Cities in Tennessee
Cities in Fayette County, Tennessee
Memphis metropolitan area